The 1901–02 Football League season was Aston Villa's 14th season in the First Division, the top flight of English football at the time. The season fell in what was to be called Villa's golden era.

During the season Jimmy Crabtree, and Joe Bache shared the captaincy of the club. Howard Spencer took the 1901–02 season off in order to rest his knee and ankle for twelve months in the hope of recovering from an injury.

On Wednesday 25 December 1901, Villa won 3–2 away to  Everton in front of a crowd of 18,000 at Goodison Park. Villa scorer, Willie Clarke became the first non-white player to score in the English First Division.

Football League

First team squad
  Joe Bache, 35 appearances
  Alf Wood, 35 appearances
  Jimmy Crabtree, 31 appearances
  Albert Wilkes, 31 appearances
  Billy Garraty, 28 appearances
  Billy George, 27 appearances, conceded 30
  Bobby Templeton, 26 appearances
  Jack Shutt, 26 appearances
  Tom Perry, 25 appearances
  Jasper McLuckie, 23 appearances
  Willie Clarke, 16 appearances
  Tommy Niblo, 14 appearances
  Micky Noon, 10 appearances
  Arthur Millar, 9 appearances
  George Johnson, 8 appearances
  Jack Whitley, 8 appearances, conceded 12
  Billy Marriott, 8 appearances
  Bert Banks, 5 appearances
  Joe Pearson, 5 appearances
  George Smith, 5 appearances
  Jack Devey, 4 appearances
  Albert Evans, 4 appearances
  Tommy Wilson, 4 appearances
  Frank Lloyd, 3 appearances
  George Harris, 3 appearances
  Billy Brawn, 1 appearance
 Harry Cooch, 1 appearance, conceded 2 
  Jimmy Cowan, 1 appearance
  Jimmy Murray, 1 appearance

References

Aston Villa F.C. seasons
Aston Villa